Berruti is an Italian surname. Notable people with the surname include:

Arnoldo Berruti, Italian water polo player
Giulio Berruti (born 1984), Italian actor
Livio Berruti (born 1939), Italian sprint runner
Valerio Berruti (born 1977), Italian artist

Italian-language surnames